Sketch comedy segments have appeared on each of the three late-night talk shows hosted by Conan O'Brien.  They are listed in the following articles:

 List of Late Night with Conan O'Brien sketches, for sketches on Late Night with Conan O'Brien
 List of The Tonight Show with Conan O'Brien sketches, for sketches on The Tonight Show with Conan O'Brien
 List of Conan sketches, for sketches on Conan